Dream of the Emperor is a South Korean television series that aired on KBS1 from September 8, 2012 to June 9, 2013 on Saturdays and Sundays at 21:40 for 70 episodes.

Plot
Kim Chun-chu is the grandson of King Jinji, but when his grandfather is overthrown, Chun-chu is denied the chance to become a successor to the throne of Silla. He later meets Kim Yu-shin, and the two men begin a friendship. Chun-chu later becomes King Muyeol, the 29th Silla monarch who leads the unification of three ancient Kingdoms – Goguryeo, Baekje and Silla, while Kim Yu-shin becomes one of the greatest generals in Korean history.

Cast

Main characters
Choi Soo-jong as Kim Chun-chu, later King Taejong Muyeol of Silla
Chae Sang-woo as young Chun-chu
Kim Yu-seok as Kim Yu-shin
Noh Young-hak as young Yu-shin
Park Joo-mi (ep. 8 – 18) and Hong Eun-hee (episode 19 – 70) as Princess Deok-man, later Queen Seondeok of Silla
Seon Joo-ah as young Deok-man
Lee Young-ah and Son Yeo-eun as Princess Seung-man, later Queen Jindeok of Silla
Kim Hyun-soo as young Seung-man

Supporting characters
Kim Chun-chu's family
Jung Dong-hwan as Kim Yong-chun (Chun-chu's father)
Jo Kyung-sook as Princess Cheonmyeong (Chun-chu's mother)
Choo So-young as Princess Bora (Chun-chu's first wife)
Lina as Kim Mun-hui, later Queen Munmyeong (Chun-chu's second wife and Yu-shin's sister)
Greena Park as Kim Go-ta-so
Jung Da-bin as young Kim Go-ta-so
Lee Jong-soo as Kim Beop-min, later King Munmu of Silla
Kim Jin-seong as young Beop-min
Jeon Kwang-jin as Kim In-mun
Choi Kyu-hyun as Queen Jaui
Jo Yong-jin as Kim Jeong-myeong

Kim Yushin's family
Choi Il-hwa as Kim Seo-hyeon (Yu-shin's father)
Kim Dong-yoon as young Seo-hyeon
Kim Ye-ryeong as Lady Man-myeong (Yu-shin's mother)
Kim Hyung-mi as young Man-myeong
Min Ji-ah as Kim Bo-hui (Yu-shin's sister)
Park Jae-woong as Kim Heum-sun (Yu-shin's younger brother)
Kim Hyun-sook as Lady Jaemae
Kim Dong-yoon as Kim Sam-kwang
Baek Seung-woo as Kim Won-sul
Lee Seul-bi as Lady Jiso (Yu-shin's third wife and Chun-chu's daughter)

Silla Royal Family
Kim Ha-kyoon as King Jinpyeong
Jung Jae-soon as Queen Dowager Sado
Hong Il-kwon as Galmunwang Guk-ban (Jinpyeong's brother)
Jo Yang-ja as Queen Dowager Manho
Im Nan-hyung as Queen Maya
Lee Si-won as Princess Bo-ryang
Jang Min-kyo as Prince Bo-ro
Chun Bo-geun as Man-hwa

Silla nobles and politicians
Im Hyuk as Kim Al-cheon
Seo In-seok as Suk Eul-jong
Lee Woo-suk as Lord Eul-je
Choi Cheol-ho as Bi-dam
Park Chil-yong as Kim Hu-jik
Yang Jae-sung as Im Jong
Lee Il-jae as Ho-rim
Bae Do-hwan as Yeom Jang
Kim Ki-doo as young Yeom Jang
 Baek Jae-jin as Man-chun
Kang Ji-hoo as Yeom Jong
Kim Myung-gook as Geum Kang
Lee Won-seok as Sa-jin

Silla's renaissance
Kim Hyuk as Geom Goon
Choi Wang-soon as Ye Won
Lee Myung-ho as Yang Do
Jung Wook as Goon Kwan
Yoo Min-ho as Chun Kwang
Yoon Hong-bin as Kwan Chang
Kim Ji-hoon as Ban Gul
Lee Won-bal as Kim Pu-mil
Choi Kyu-hwan as Kim Jin-ju
Jung Dong-kyu as Kim Jin-heum

Other Silla figures
Lee Dae-ro as Monk Wongwang
Jo Jae-wan as Baek Seok
Choi Beom-ho as Chan-deok
Lee Chul-min as Chil-suk
Yeom Cheol-ho as Seok-pum
Kim Hong-pyo as Kim Pum-seok
Lee Byung-wook as Geom Il
Kim Tae-hyung as Kang-su
Kim Hyung-il as Dong Ta-cheon

Gwimundan
Jang Dong-jik as Bi-hyeong
Kim Kyung-ryong as Nan-seung
Lee Jung-yong as Gil-dal
Noh Young-jo as young On Goon-hae
Lee Se-young as Chun Gwan-nyeo
Kim Jin-yi as Si-noh
Hong Soo-ah as Yeon-hwa
Kang Ye-seo as young Yeon-hwa
Lee Ah-yi as Cha-bi
Lee Hye-in as young Cha-bi
Jang Joon-nyung as Mo-cheok
Maya as Ho-rang
Kim Hyun-jung as Myo-rang

Goguryeo
Choi Dong-joon as Yeon Gae-so-mun
Ahn Shin-woo as King Bojang of Goguryeo
Kim Seon-dong as Noi Eum-shin

Baekje
Park Chul-ho as King Mu of Baekje
Lee Jin-woo as King Uija of Baekje
Cha Gi-hwan as Gye-ru
Gong Jung-hwan as Buyeo Yung
Heo Jung-min as Buyeo Tae
Kim Min-ki as Buyeo Hyo
Jang Tae-sung as Buyeo Pung
Choi Jae-sung as General Gye-baek
Jo Eun-sook as Gye-baek's wife
Kim Chul-ki as Do-chung
Kim Young-ki as Boksin
Choi Woo-joon as Yun Chung
Kim Won-bae as Seong Chung
Im Byung-ki as Hong-su
Won Seok-yeon as Sang-young
Choi Dong-yub as Ui-jik
Hong In-young as Hwa-si
Jung Seung-woo as Do-jim
Jo Tae-bong as Chung-seung

Tang Dynasty
Yoon Seung-won as Emperor Taizong of Tang
Seo Dong-soo as Emperor Gaozong of Tang
Jung Heung-chae as So Jeong-bang
Bang Hyung-joo as Dong Bo-ryang
Sun Dong-hyuk as Yu In-won
Kim Young Sun as Yu In-gwe
Choi Nak-hee as Son In-sa
Oh Sang-hoon as Tang commander

Japan
Kim Min-kyung as Empress Kōgyoku
Ahn Hong-jin as Prince Naka no Ōe
Noh Seung-jin as Nakatomi no Kamatari
Jung Jin-gak as Soga no Iruka

References

External links
  
 

Korean-language television shows
Korean Broadcasting System television dramas
2012 South Korean television series debuts
2013 South Korean television series endings
Television series set in Silla
South Korean historical television series